Tony De Beatidi Djim (born 13 January 1997), simply known as Tony Djim is a Belgian professional footballer.

Club career

Porto B
After progressing through the youth system at Standard Liège, Tony moved with his brother Célestin Djim to Porto in the summer of 2014.
Tony is described as a fast and physically strong attacker. In the  2019–20 season, his last for the Portuguese club, he scored 3 goals in 10 matches, before the league ended because of  coronavirus pandemic in Portugal.
Djim officially leaves  Porto in June 2020, after six years at the club.

International career
Tony is a former youth international of Belgium, he played eleven times for the Belgium U-19 team, scoring one goal against Sweden U-19 and providing three assists between 2015 and 2016. He and his brother, Célestin Djim, are still eligible to play for the Central African Republic, the country of their father.

Personal life
He is the son of the former Central African Republic international footballer Luciano Djim and brother of fellow footballer Célestin Djim.

External links

1997 births
Living people
People from Visé
Association football forwards
FC Porto B players
Liga Portugal 2 players
Belgian footballers
Belgium youth international footballers
Belgian expatriate footballers
Belgian expatriate sportspeople in Portugal
Expatriate footballers in Portugal
Belgian people of Central African Republic descent
Belgian sportspeople of African descent
Footballers from Liège Province